Victor Jean Félix Henri Letocart (6 February 1866 – 1945) was a French organist and composer.

Biography 
Born in Courbevoie, Henri Letocard was the son of a music teacher, Joseph Félix Letocart. He began his musical studies in 1879 at the École Niedermeyer, with Clément Loret and Eugène Gigout for the organ, before entering the Conservatoire de Paris in 1885 in the organ classes of César Franck and music composition of Ernest Guiraud. After the Conservatory, where he obtained a second degree in organ in 1887, he was first called to the position of organist of the church of St. Vincent de Paul.

Letocart was one of the most militant supporters of the restoration of liturgical chant.

The organist and composer André Fleury was one of his students, as was the composer .

Works 
 La Lyre Catholique, 3 volumes of pieces for harmonium (entries, offerings, elevations, communions, exits, verses) specially written for the religious service
 Pieces for organ
 Motets
 Mélodies
 Symphonic poems

Bibliography 
 Biographical notes in Maîtres contemporains de l'orgue, volume 2, 1911

References

External links 
 Henri Letocart on IdRef
 
 

1866 births
1945 deaths
People from Courbevoie
19th-century French composers
20th-century French composers
French composers of sacred music
French classical organists
French male organists
19th-century French male musicians
20th-century French male musicians
Male classical organists